Lab Eshkan (also Romanized as Labeshkan) is a village in Khalili Rural District, in the Central District of Gerash County, Fars Province, Iran. At the 2016 census, its population was 1208, in 229 families.

References 

Populated places in Gerash County